Adham El Zabedieh is a Lebanese professional rugby league footballer who most recently played as er for the Mount Pritchard Mounties in the New South Wales Cup.

El Zabedieh is a Lebanese international.

References

Lebanese rugby league players
Lebanon national rugby league team players
Rugby league wingers
Mount Pritchard Mounties players
Living people
Year of birth missing (living people)